Gaggiano railway station is a railway station in Italy. Located on the Mortara–Milan railway, it serves the municipality of Gaggiano.

Services
Gaggiano is served by line S9 of the Milan suburban railway service, operated by the Lombard railway company Trenord.

See also
 Milan suburban railway service

References

External links

Railway stations in Lombardy
Milan S Lines stations
Railway stations opened in 1870